Muddy Waters is the third studio album from American rapper Redman, released December 10, 1996, on Def Jam Recordings.

The album debuted at number 12 on the US Billboard 200. The album was also certified gold by the Recording Industry Association of America (RIAA) for exceeding shipments of 500,000 copies.

Critical reception

Steve Huey of AllMusic, though critical of the album's numerous interludes, stated that "lyrically, Redman is as strong as ever," and of the overall work, remarked that "Muddy Waters solidifies Redman's growing reputation as one of the most consistent rappers of the '90s."

Redman has stated that he had planned on releasing a sequel to the album entitled Muddy Waters 2, considering it is his most classic work.

Commercial performance
Muddy Waters debuted at number 12 on the US Billboard 200 and number one on the US Top R&B/Hip-Hop Albums chart, becoming his second number one on the chart. On February 12, 1997, the album was certified gold by the Recording Industry Association of America (RIAA) for sales of over 500,000 copies. As of October 2009, the album has 767,000 copies in the United States.

Track listing

Personnel
Adapted from AllMusic.
 Erick Sermon – executive producer – vocals
 Dave Greenberg – mixing
 Troy Hightower – mixing
 Method Man – performer
 Redman – producer
 Rockwilder - producer
 Redman – vocals
 Method Man – vocals
 Napalm – vocals
 Rockwilder – vocals

Charts

Weekly charts

Year-end charts

Certifications

See also
 List of Billboard number-one R&B albums of 1996

References

External links
 

1996 albums
Albums produced by Erick Sermon
Albums produced by Rockwilder
Def Jam Recordings albums
Redman (rapper) albums